Ivorypress was founded in London in 1996 by Elena Ochoa Foster as a publishing house specialising in artists' books. The project currently encompasses a wide range of areas and activities within the framework of contemporary art, including its own art gallery and bookshop, art consultancy and art exhibitions curatorship, editorial services, audio-visual productions and education.

In 2008 Ivorypress Art + Books was established. This comprises a bookshop and an art gallery, with a permanent artists’ books exhibition and an ongoing temporary exhibitions programme that have made Ivorypress Space one of the most emblematic art galleries and significant actors in Madrid’s cultural scene.

In addition to its exhibition calendar in Madrid, Ivorypress is also involved in intense curatorial activity surrounding the creation, design and production of international exhibition projects in collaboration with significant institutions and events. Ivorypress is also involved in the education and support of emerging talents, as well as in the promotion of contemporary art in higher education. Every year Ivorypress sponsors and organises a Contemporary Art Professorship—the first academic initiative of its kind—at the University of Oxford, UK, in association with the Ruskin School of Drawing & Fine Art and Magdalen College. Ivorypress publishes the C International Photo Magazine.

Elena Ochoa Foster is the founder and CEO of Ivorypress.

Artists' books collection

Ivorypress's artist book collection comprises hundreds of works by Spanish and international artists. The collection brings together some of the most significant artists' books from the 19th century to the present day.

An important focus of the Ivorypress collection is to ensure the correct restoration and conservation of these historic works. To this end, it employs a group of experts to ensure all aspects of conservation, from producing shelving adapted for the proper storage of the books, to manufacturing archive boxes, through to the use of durable materials in the production of the books.

Ivorypress hosts a permanent exhibition of a selection of its titles at its space in Madrid and organises temporary exhibitions related to artists' books. It has recently acquired all of the editions published by the Library Council of the Museum of Modern Art, New York (MoMA), which have been exhibited as part of the collection since February 2016. Ivorypress also carries out extensive educational work, organising guided tours of the collection for individuals and groups of students.

Artists' books
Ivorypress's publishing house publishes artists’ books. Far removed from conventional books, they are extremely valuable works of art individually designed and produced by each artist. Conceived to be displayed as works of art, each book is published as a numbered limited edition and is carefully produced using techniques ranging from rediscovered medieval processes to the most advanced modern technologies.

These artists’ books are part of the collections of Museo Chillida-Leku, San Sebastián, Spain; Museo Nacional Centro de Arte Reina Sofía (MNCARS), Madrid, Spain; Museum of Modern Art, New York, USA; The Noguchi Museum, New York, USA; Victoria and Albert Museum, London, UK, and foundations such as the Cass Sculpture Foundation, Goodwood, UK; The Estate of Francis Bacon, London, UK; Fundação Serralves, Porto, Portugal, as well as private collections worldwide such as Colección Pérez Simón, Mexico, and the François Pinault Collection, Venice, Italy.

 Eduardo Chillida. Reflections. Ivorypress, 2002
 Anthony Caro. Open Secret. Ivorypress, 2004
 Anish Kapoor. Wound. Ivorypress, 2005
 Francis Bacon. Detritus. Ivorypress, 2006
 Richard Long. Walking and Sleeping. Ivorypress, 2007
 Isamu Noguchi. 18 Drawings, 18 Photographs. Ivorypress, 2007
 Cai Guo-Qiang. Danger Book: Suicide Fireworks. Ivorypress, 2008
 Richard Tuttle. NotThePoint. Ivorypress, 2009
 Ai Weiwei. Becoming. Ivorypress, 2009
 Isidoro Valcárcel Medina. ilimit. Ivorypress, 2012
 Maya Lin. Cloudline: Everest at 20,000 feet. Ivorypress, 2013
 Olafur Eliasson. A view becomes a window. Ivorypress, 2013
 Marc Quinn. Thames River Water Atlas. Ivorypress, 2017
 William Kentridge. Tummelplatz. Ivorypress, 2017
 Edmund de Waal. breath. Ivorypress, 2019
 Michal Rovner. Document. Ivorypress, 2020

Exhibitions
2009   
 Miroslav Tichý. Mirography. Ivorypress, Madrid, Spain. 15/02/2009 - 15/04/2009
 C Photo. Ivorypress, Madrid, Spain. 24/04/2009 - 16/05/2009
 Ai Weiwei. Ways Beyond Art.  Ivorypress, Madrid, Spain. 19/05/2009 - 18/07/2009
 Norman Foster. Drawings 1958-2008. Ivorypress, Madrid, Spain. 01/09/2009 - 19/09/2009
2010
 Michal Rovner. Frequency. Ivorypress, Madrid, Spain. 01/10/2009 - 04/01/2010
 Claes Oldenburg & Coosje Van Bruggen. The European Desktop.  Ivorypress, Madrid, Spain. 16/02/2010 - 27/04/2010
 Los Carpinteros. Drama Turquesa. Ivorypress, Madrid, Spain. 04/05/2010 - 30/07/2010
 Bucky Fuller & Spaceship Earth. Ivorypress, Madrid, Spain. 01/09/2010 - 30/10/2010
 Warhol & Dance: New York in the 50s. Ivorypress, Madrid, Spain. 27/10/2010 - 11/12/2010
2011
 Vanity Fair 100 years: Masters of Photography. Ivorypress, Madrid, Spain. 17/11/2010 - 08/01/2011
 Francis Bacon. Detritus. Ivorypress, Madrid, Spain. 15/12/2010 - 05/02/2011
 John Gerrard. Ivorypress, Madrid, Spain. 07/02/2011 - 02/04/2011
 Anselm Kiefer. Die Argonauten. Ivorypress, Madrid, Spain. 15/02/2011 - 26/03/2011
 Julião Sarmento. Papel. Ivorypress, Madrid, Spain. 01/04/2011 - 28/05/2011
 Gilbert & George. The Urethra Postcard Pictures. Ivorypress, Madrid, Spain. 14/04/2011 - 14/05/2011
 Luisa Lambri. Interiors. Ivorypress, Madrid, Spain. 26/05/2011 - 09/07/2011
 Imaginary Cities. Ivorypress, Madrid, Spain. 07/06/2011 - 30/07/2011
 Jean Prouvé 1901-1984: Industrial Beauty. Ivorypress, Madrid, Spain. 01/09/2011 - 12/11/2011
 Arroyo/Gordillo/Socías. CA-RO-TA. Ivorypress, Madrid, Spain. 07/09/2011 - 05/11/2011
2012 
 Antonio Girbés. Delirious City. Ivorypress, Madrid, Spain. 16/11/2011 - 05/01/2012
 Pedro Cabrita Reis. Los Rojos. Ivorypress, Madrid, Spain. 25/11/2011 - 21/01/2012
 Hannah Collins: The Fragile Feast. Ivorypress, Madrid, Spain. 12/01/2012 - 04/02/2012
 Isidoro Valcárcel Medina. ilimit. Ivorypress, Madrid, Spain. 14/02/2012 - 25/02/2012
 Edward Burtynsky, David Maisel, Nuno Ramos and Carlo Valsecchi. Subverted. Ivorypress, Madrid, Spain. 14/02/2012 - 14/04/2012
 Revelations. The History of the Photobook in Latin America. Ivorypress, Madrid, Spain. 05/06/2012 - 14/07/2012
 Zaha Hadid. Beyond Boundaries, Art and Design. Ivorypress, Madrid, Spain. 04/09/2012 - 03/11/2012
2013
 Not Vital. 5 Spaniards & Nothing. Ivorypress, Madrid, Spain. 22/11/2012 - 26/01/2013
 Daniel Lergon. Siderian Tides. Ivorypress, Madrid, Spain. 12/02/2013 - 16/03/2013
 Ilya & Emilia Kabakov. Vertical Paintings and Other Works. Ivorypress, Madrid, Spain. 09/04/2013 - 18/05/2013
 Dionisio González. Le Corbusier: The Last Project. Ivorypress, Madrid, Spain. 30/05/2013 - 13/07/2013
 Eliasson Olafur. A view becomes a window. Ivorypress, Madrid, Spain. 9/09/2013 – 28/09/2013
 Ron Arad. Ivorypress, Madrid, Spain. 05/09/2013 - 09/11/2013
 Bohnchang Koo. "Slow Talk". Ivorypress, Madrid, Spain. 21/11/2013 - 25/01/2014
2014
 Los Carpinteros. "Bazar". Ivorypress, Madrid, Spain. 18/02/2014 - 03/05/2014
 Cristina Iglesias & Thomas Struth. "On Reality". Ivorypress, Madrid, Spain. 28/05/2014 - 12/07/2014
 Maya Lin. "Rivers and Mountains". Ivorypress, Madrid, Spain. 16/09/2014 - 01/11/2014
 Jerónimo Elespe. "Lost Grey Machines". Ivorypress, Madrid, Spain. 20/11/2014 - 10/01/2015
2015
 "Books beyond Artists: Words and Images". Ivorypress, Madrid, Spain 24/02/2015 - 09/05/2015
 Laia Abril, Alberto Lizaralde, Javier Marquerie Thomas, Óscar Monzón and Jordi Ruiz Cirera. "Under 35". Ivorypress, Madrid, Spain. 26/05/2015 - 18/07/2015
 José Manuel Ballester. "Museos en Blanco". Ivorypress, Madrid, Spain. 08/09/2015 - 07/11/2015
 Daniel Lergon. "Particle Traces". Ivorypress, Madrid, Spain. 24/11/2015 - 23/01/2016
2016
 MoMA Artists' Books. Ivorypress, Madrid, Spain. 23/02/2016 - 14/05/2016
 Richard Long. "Gravity". Ivorypress, Madrid, Spain. 23/02/2016 - 14/05/2016
 Los Carpinteros. "Watercolours". Ivorypress, Madrid, Spain. 23/02/2016 - 02/04/2016
 Chloe Dewe Mathews. "Shot at Dawn". Ivorypress, Madrid, Spain. 23/05/2016 - 16/07/2016
 Conrad Shawcross. "Inverted Spires and Descendant Folds". Ivorypress, Madrid, Spain. 14/09/2016 - 12/11/2016
 Cornelia Parker. "Verso". Ivorypress, Madrid, España. 14/09/2016 - 12/11/2016
 "Paris Photo-Aperture Foundation Photobook Awards". Ivorypress, Madrid, Spain. 28/11/2016 - 14/01/2017
 Roland Summer. "Under The Surface". Ivorypress, Madrid, Spain. 28/11/2016 - 14/01/2017
2017
 Michael Chow. "Sunset at Pacific Vortex". Ivorypress, Madrid, Spain. 22/02/2017 - 13/05/2017
 Marc Quinn. "Thames River Water". Ivorypress, Madrid, Spain. 22/02/2017 - 13/05/2017
 Mariana Cook. "Lifeline". Ivorypress, Madrid, Spain. 30/05/2017 - 15/07/2017
 Brian Eno. "Light". Ivorypress, Madrid, Spain. 30/05/2017 - 15/07/2017
 Yves Berger. "From the orchard to the garden". Ivorypress, Madrid, Spain. 14/09/2017 - 28/10/2017
 Callum Innes. "In Two". Ivorypress, Madrid, Spain. 14/09/2017 - 11/11/2017
 Vicken Parsons. "On Reflection". Ivorypress, Madrid, Spain. 22/11/2017 - 27/01/2018
 William Kentridge. "Tummelplatz". Ivorypress, Madrid, Spain. 02/11/17 - 27/01/18
2018
 Terry Haggerty. "Still Motion". Ivorypress, Madrid, Spain. 21/02/2018 - 05/05/2018
 "Cahiers d’Art: From Calder to Sugimoto". Ivorypress, Madrid, Spain. 21/12/2018 - 05/05/2018
 Gabriella Gerosa. "The Power of the Portrait". Ivorypress, Madrid, Spain. 24/05/2018 - 21/07/2018
 José Manuel Ballester. "Variaciones a partir de Malevich". Ivorypress, Madrid, Spain. 24/05/2018 - 21/07/2018
 Kasper Akhøj. "Welcome (To The Teknival)". Ivorypress, Madrid, Spain. 12/09/2018 - 03/11/2018
 Felipe Cohen. "Broken Light". Ivorypress, Madrid, Spain. 12/09/2018 - 03/11/2018
 Gavin Turk. "White Van Man". Ivorypress, Madrid, Spain. 15/11/2018 - 19/01/2019
 Guillaume Bruère. "I Have Nothing Left for You". Ivorypress, Madrid, Spain. 15/11/2018 - 19/01/2019
2019
 Edmund de Waal. "breath". Ivorypress, Madrid, Spain. 20/02/2019 - 11/05/2019
 Dionisio González. "Concrete Island". Ivorypress, Madrid, Spain. 29/05/2019 - 27/07/2019
 Bohnchang Koo. "The Allure of Blue". Ivorypress, Madrid, Spain. 29/05/2019 - 27/07/2019
 Dagoberto Rodríguez. "Tus manos están bien". Ivorypress, Madrid, Spain. 17/09/2019 - 26/10/2019
 Fernando Casasempere. "Geology". Ivorypress, Madrid, Spain. 06/11/2019 - 11/01/2020
2020
 Blanca Miró Skoudy. "Dibujos". Ivorypress, Madrid, Spain. 26/02/2020 - 09/05/2020
 Michal Rovner. "Document". Ivorypress, Madrid, Spain. 26/02/2020 - 09/05/2020
 Bob Colacello. "It Just Happened". Ivorypress, Madrid, Spain. 19/11/2020 - 30/09/2021
2022
 Highlights from the Ivorypress Collection. "Looking Forward: Ivorypress at Twenty-Five". Ivorypress, Madrid, Spain. 23/02/2022 - 17/12/2022

Curatorial projects
 Anish Kapoor - Risanamento SPA Milano, Italy, 2006
 C on Cities - 10th Venice Biennale of Architecture, 10 September - 19 November 2006
 Cai Guo-Qiang. Dreams Along the Stairway- Hearst Corporation, New York, USA, 2007
 Richard Long. "Riverlines" - Hearst Corporation, New York, USA, 2007
 NY C -  Phillips de Pury, New York, USA. 07 - 26 September 2007
 Blood on Paper - Victoria and Albert Museum. London, UK. 15 April - 28 June 2008
 Horizons - Fondation Beyeler, Basel, Switzerland. 26 March 2009.
 C Action Photo Virus - Langhans Galerie Praha, Prague, Czech Republic. 30 March- 15 May 2011
 Real Venice - 54th Venice Biennale, Venice, Italy and Somerset House, London, UK, 2011
 Los Carpinteros. Silence your Eyes - Exhibition held from 8 April 2012 - 8 July 2012 at the Kunstmuseum Thun (Switzerland) and subsequently from 1 December 2012 until 3 February 2013 in the Kunstverein Hannover (Germany)
 Gateway - 13th International Architecture Exhibition, 'Common Ground'. Venice Architecture Biennale 2012 Venice Architecture Biennale 2012. 29 August - 25 November 2012ToledoContemporánea - El Greco 2014 Foundation, Toledo, Spain. 18 February - 14 July 2014Miroslav Tichý - The Museum of Romanticism, Madrid, Spain. 2 June - 28 August 2016

Other exhibitions
 Miroslav Tichý, Villa Flor (Switzerland), 2013
 Slow Talk, Bohnchang Koo, Villa Flor (Switzerland), 2014
 Helmet, Los Carpinteros, Museo Folkwang Essen (Germany), 2014
 Los Carpinteros, Parasol Unit for Contemporary Art, London (UK), 2015
 The Globe, Los Carpinteros, Victoria & Albert Museum, London (UK), 2015The Fossil Suite, Pedro Cabrita Reis, Villa Flor (Switzerland), 2016Verdichtung, Daniel Lergon, Villa Flor (Switzerland), 2017 Document, Michal Rovner, Biblioteca Nacional de España (Spain), 2021A view becomes a Window, Olafur Eliasson, Museo Lázaro Galdiano (Spain), 2021Looking Forward. Ivorypress at Twenty-Five, Library of the Museum of Modern Art (USA), 2021Ivorypress at Kettle’s Yard, Kettle’s Yard (UK), 2021Detritus', Francis Bacon, British Library (UK), 2021
Imago Mundi. Books for times of barbarism and civilisation, CICUS (Spain), 2021
Ivorypress at the Museo de Bellas Artes de Bilbao, Museo de Bellas Artes de Bilbao (Spain), 2021
ilimit, Isidoro Varcárcel Medina, Museo Reina Sofía (Spain), 2022
Marc Quinn: History Painting+, Marc Quinn, Yale Center for British Art (USA), 2022
Open Secret, Anthony Caro and Hans Magnus Enzensberger, Warburg Institute (UK), 2022
Looking Forward. Ivorypress at Twenty-Five, Edmund de Waal and William Kentridge, Bodleian Library (UK),2022

Publications

Exhibition Catalogues
 Michal Rovner. Frequency. Ivorypress, 2009. Edited by Elena Ochoa Foster and James Lindon. Bilingual edition English/Spanish
 Ai Weiwei. Ways Beyond Art. Ivorypress, 2009. Edited by Elena Ochoa Foster and Hans Ulrich Obrist. Bilingual edition English/Spanish
 Claes Oldenburg and Coosje van Bruggen. The European Desktop. Ivorypress, 2010. Edited by Elena Ochoa Foster. Bilingual edition English/Spanish
 Claes Oldenburg and Coosje van Bruggen. The European Desktop - Exhibition guide. Ivorypress, 2010. Bilingual edition English/Spanish
 Los Carpinteros. Drama Turquesa. Ivorypress, 2010. Edited by Elena Ochoa Foster. Bilingual edition English/Spanish
 John Gerrard. Ivorypress, 2011. Bilingual edition English/Spanish
 Luisa Lambri. Interiors. Ivorypress, 2011. Bilingual edition English/Spanish
 Luis Gordillo, Eduardo Arroyo, Jordi Socías. CA-RO-TA. Ivorypress, 2011. Bilingual edition English/Spanish
 Los Carpinteros. Silence Your Eyes. Ivorypress, 2012. English/Spanish/German edition.
 Pedro Cabrita Reis. a remote whisper. Ivorypress, 2013. English edition
 Bohnchang Koo. Slow Talk. Ivorypress, 2014. English edition
 Cristina Iglesias & Thomas Struth. Constructions of the Imaginations. Ivorypress, 2014. Bilingual edition English/Spanish
 Maya Lin. River and Mountains. Ivorypress, 2014. Bilingual edition English/Spanish
 Jerónimo Elespe. The Antipodal Room. Ivorypress, 2014. Bilingual edition English/Spanish
 Books beyond Artists: Words and Images. Ivorypress, 2015. English edition
 Under 35. Ivorypress, 2015. Bilingual edition English/Spanish
 Conrad Shawcross. Inverted Spires and Descendant Folds. Ivorypress, 2016. Bilingual edition English/Spanish
 Mariana Cook. Lifeline. Ivorypress, 2017. Bilingual edition English/Spanish
 Yves Berger. From the Orchard to the Garden. Ivorypress, 2017. English edition
 Vicken Parsons. On Reflection. Ivorypress, 2017. Bilingual edition English/Spanish
 Terry Haggerty. Still Motion. Ivorypress, 2018. English edition
 José Manuel Ballester. Variaciones a partir de Malevich. Ivorypress, 2018. English edition
 Gabriella Gerosa. The Power of the Portrait. Ivorypress, 2018. English edition
 Kasper Akhøj. Welcome (To The Teknival). Ivorypress, 2018. English edition
 Felipe Cohen. Broken Light. Ivorypress, 2018. English edition
 Gavin Turk. White Van Man. Ivorypress, 2018. English edition
 Guillaume Bruère. I Have Nothing Left for You. Ivorypress, 2018. English edition
 Edmund de Waal. breath. Ivorypress, 2019. English edition
 Dionisio González. Concrete Island. Ivorypress, 2019. English edition
 Bohnchang Koo. The Allure of Blue. Ivorypress, 2019. English edition
 Dagoberto Rodríguez. Tus manos están bien. Ivorypress, 2019. English edition
 Fernando Casasempere. Geology. Ivorypress, 2019. English edition
 Blanca Miró Skoudy. Dibujos. Ivorypress, 2020. English edition
 VV.AA. "Highlights from the Ivorypress collection." Ivorypress, 2022, English edition

C Photo Project
 C Photo 01. Ivorypress, 2006. Two editions: Japanese/Spanish and Chinese/English
 C Photo 02. Ivorypress, 2006. Two editions: Japanese/Spanish and Chinese/English
 C Photo 03. Ivorypress, 2007. Two editions: Japanese/Spanish and Chinese/English
 C Photo 04. Ivorypress, 2007. Two editions: Japanese/Spanish and Chinese/English
 C Photo 05. Ivorypress, 2008. Two editions: Japanese/Spanish and Chinese/English
 C Photo 06. Ivorypress, 2008. Two editions: Japanese/Spanish and Chinese/English
 C Photo 07. Ivorypress, 2009. Two editions: Japanese/Spanish and Chinese/English
 C Photo 08, Glass Hero. Ivorypress, 2009. Two editions: Japanese/Spanish and Chinese/English
 C Photo 09, Nine. Ivorypress, 2010. Two editions: Japanese/Spanish and Chinese/English
 C Photo 10 Making Movies. Ivorypress, 2010. Two editions: Japanese/Spanish and Chinese/English
 C Photo Genesis. Ivorypress, 2010. Texts by Hans Magnus Enzensberger. Bilingual edition English/Spanish
 C Photo Real Venice. Ivorypress 2011. Texts by Maria Antonella Pelizzari, Claudio Piersanti and William A. Ewing. Bilingual edition English/Spanish
 C Photo Posed/Unposed. Ivorypress 2011. Guest-edited by Tobia Bezzola. Bilingual edition English/Spanish
 C Photo New Latin Look. Ivorypress, 2012. Guest-edited by Martin Parr. Bilingual edition English/Spanish
 C Photo Slow Motion. Ivorypress, 2012. Guest-edited by Marta Gili. Bilingual edition English/Spanish
 C Photo Observed. Ivorypress, 2013. Guest-edited by Jörg Colberg. Bilingual edition English/Spanish
 C Photo Photographicness. Ivorypress, 2013. Guest-edited by Charlotte Cotton. Bilingual edition English/Spanish
 C Photo ToledoContemporánea. Ivorypress, 2014. Bilingual edition English/Spanish
 C Photo Street. Ivorypress, 2014. Bilingual edition English/Spanish
 C Photo Don't call me a photographer!. Ivorypress, 2015. Bilingual edition English/Spanish

LiberArs
 Gerhard Richter. Sils. Ivorypress LiberArs, 2009. Edited by Hans Ulrich Obrist. German/English/Spanish edition
 Richard Long. Gravity. Ivorypress LiberArs, 2009. Edited by Richard Long. English/Spanish edition
 Anselm Kiefer. Die Argonauten. Ivorypress LiberArs, 2010. Edited by Anselm Kiefer. German/English/Spanish edition
 Pedro Cabrita Reis. Tree of Light. Ivorypress LiberArs, 2011. Edited by Pedro Cabrita Reis. English/Spanish edition
 Thomas Demand. Model Studies. Ivorypress LiberArs, 2011. Edited by Thomas Demand. English/Spanish edition
 Jannis Kounellis. Senza Titolo. Ivorypress LiberArs, 2012. Edited by Jannis Kounellis. Italian/English/Spanish edition
 Cristina Iglesias. La jalousie. Edited by Cristina Iglesias. Ivorypress LiberArs, 2013. English/Spanish edition
 Santiago Sierra. El trabajo es la Dictadura. Edited by Santiago Sierra. Ivorypress LiberArs, 2013. Spanish edition
 Vik Muniz. The Weimar File. Edited by Vik Muniz. Ivorypress LiberArs, 2013. Bilingual edition English/Spanish
 Thomas Struth. Walking. Edited by Thomas Struth. Ivorypress LiberArs, 2013. English edition
 Francis Alÿs. Pacing. Edited by Francis Alÿs. Ivorypress LiberArs, 2014. English edition
 José Manuel Ballester. Museos en Blanco. Edited by José Manuel Ballester. Ivorypress LiberArs, 2015. English/Spanish edition
 Sarah Morris. Crease Folds. Edited by Sarah Morris. Ivorypress LiberArs, 2015. English edition
 Callum Innes. Edges. Edited by Callum Innes. Ivorypress LiberArs, 2016. English edition
 Cornelia Parker. Verso. Edited by Cornelia Parker. Ivorypress LiberArs, 2016. English edition
 Jenny Holzer. Belligerent. Edited by Jenny Holzer and Joshua Craze. Ivorypress LiberArs, 2017. English edition
 David Maisel. Mount St. Helens: Afterlife. Ivorypress, 2018. English edition
 Shirin Neshat. Dreamers. Ivorypress, 2018. English edition
 Wangechi Mutu. A Promise to Communicate. Ivorypress, 2019. English edition
 Michal Rovner. Writings. Ivorypress, 2020. English edition
 Edwin Schlossberg. Tidal Gestures | Word: Nerve. 2021. English edition
 Adriana Varejão. Polvo. 2021. English Edition

Architecture
 Buckminster Fuller. Dymaxion Car. Ivorypress Architecture, 2010. Bilingual edition English/Spanish
 Norman Foster: Drawings 1958-2008. Ivorypress Architecture, 2010. Bilingual edition English/Spanish
 Moving. Norman Foster on Art. Ivorypress Architecture, 2013. Bilingual edition English/French
 Ron Arad. Another Twist in the Plot. Ivorypress Architecture, 2013. Bilingual edition English/Spanish
 Norman Foster and Oscar Niemeyer in conversation with Hans Ulrich Obrist. Ivorypress Architecture, 2013. English edition
 Norman Foster and Mauricio Vicent. Havana. Autos and Architecture. Ivorypress Architecture, 2014. Bilingual edition English/Spanish

Essential
 Paul Goldberger. Por qué importa la arquitectura. Ivorypress Essential, 2012. Spanish edition of Why Architecture Matters
 Juan Cruz Ruiz. A Crazy Job. Leading Publishers in Conversation with Juan Cruz Ruiz. Ivorypress Essential, 2012. English edition (Spanish edition: Un Oficio de Locos. Editores fundamentales en conversación con Juan Cruz Ruiz)

Arts Litterae
 Berenice Abbott. Selected Writings. Ivorypress Arts Litterae, 2020. English edition

Cities
 André Aciman and Jeannette Montgomery Barron. Roman Hours. Ivorypress Cities, 2020. English edition
 Jorge Carrión and Alberto García-Alix. Madrid. Book of Books. Ivorypress Cities, 2021. Spanish and English editions
 Rachel Spence and Giacomo Cosua. Venice Unclocked. Ivorypress Cities, 2020. English edition

Archives
 Bob Colacello. It Just Happened. Photographs by Bob Colacello 1976-1982. Ivorypress Archives, 2020. English edition
 Sophie Taeuber-Arp. Album. Ivorypress Archives, 2021. English edition

Oxford Lectures
 Thomas Struth. On Picture-Making. Ivorypress, 2011. English edition
 Glenn D. Lowry. Abodes of the Muses: Theorising the Modern Art Museum. Ivorypress, 2011. English edition
 Shirin Neshat. Images and History. Ivorypress, 2012. English edition
 Malcom Rogers. The Art Museum in the 21st century. Ivorypress, 2012. English edition
 Ivo Mesquita. Museums: Experience versus Numbers. Ivorypress, 2013. English edition
 William Kentridge. Thinking on one's feet: A Walking Tour of the Studio. Ivorypress, 2013. English edition
 Michael Govan. Between the Artist and the Museum. Ivorypress, 2014. English edition
 Vik Muniz. Class dismissed... Art, Creativity and Education. Ivorypress, 2014. English edition
 Maya Lin. Between Art and Architecture, Ivorypress, 2015. English edition
 Stephen Greenblatt. Getting Real, Ivorypress, 2015. English edition

Special Editions

 Helmut Newton. A Gun for Hire. Ivorypress, 2005
 Horizons. Ivorypress, 2008
 Blood on Paper. Ivorypress, 2008. Co-published by Ivorypress and Victoria and Albert Museum
 Ai Weiwei. Becoming. Ivorypress, 2009. Edited by Brendan McGetrick. English Edition
 Aitor Ortiz. Not Vital by Aitor Ortiz. Ivorypress, 2014. English Edition
 Chloe Dewe Mathews. Shot at Dawn. Ivorypress, 2014.
 Daniel Lergon & Gregory Carlock. Fire Untouched by Smoke.  Ivorypress, 2015
 Jean-Pierre Blay, Alain de Botton, Bob Colacello, Norman Foster, Nicholas Foulkes, Carole Kasapi, Rossy de Palma, Pierre Rainero and Deyan Sudjic. Cartier in Motion. Ivorypress, 2017.
 VV.AA.Looking Forward:Ivorypress at Twenty-Five. Ivorypress, 2021
 Norman Foster. "Motion. Autos, Art, Architecture". Co-published by Ivorypress and Guggenheim Bilbao Museum, 2022

Bookshop
Ivorypress's bookshop specialises in photography, contemporary art and architecture.

Education

 Humanitas Visiting Professorships in Contemporary Art at the University of Oxford

Ivorypress is also involved in the education and support of emerging talents as well as in the promotion of contemporary art in higher education. Every year Ivorypress sponsors and organises a Contemporary Art Professorship—the first academic initiative of its kind—at the University of Oxford, UK, in association with the Ruskin School of Drawing & Fine Art and Magdalen College. The lectures are published by Ivorypress each year and distributed freely among the students of the University of Oxford.

 Universidad Carlos III, Madrid

In Spain, Ivorypress has an agreement with the Universidad Carlos III de Madrid and works together with its Humanities department to promote joint cultural projects that contribute to the knowledge and promotion of contemporary art and to improve social communication of the visual arts.

 Student training

Ivorypress takes part in student training through internships. Internships are educational in nature and carried out by university students under the supervision of the Ivorypress team. The aim is for students to apply and reinforce the knowledge they have acquired throughout their academic training, encouraging them to practise skills that will prepare them for professional activities and boost their employment prospects.

Ivorypress currently has agreements with the following institutions:

 Escuela Superior de Diseño, Madrid
 Universidad Carlos III, Madrid
 Universidad Complutense, Madrid
 Universidad Autónoma, Madrid
 Universidad Politécnica, Madrid
 Instituto Europeo de Diseño, Madrid
 International Photography grants

Ivorypress has promoted and financed twenty international C Action grants through the C Photo project.

 2006
 C Photo 01: Eustaquio Neves and Mitra Tabrizian
 C Photo 02: Julia Fullerton-Batten and Rongrong & Inri

 2007
 C Photo 03: Antonio Girbés and ANIU
 C Photo 04: Julia Peirone and Loan Nguyen

 2008
 C Photo 05: Giacomo Costa and Sun Hongbin
 C Photo 06: Marie Taillefer and Kyungwoo Chun

 2009
 C Photo 07: Lovisa Ringborg and Flore-Aël Surun
 C Photo 08: Victor Albrow and Lia Sáile

 2010
 C Photo 09: Jordi Gual and Veru Iché
 C Photo 10: Alfonso Zubiaga and Alexander Gronsky

 Guided Tours

Ivorypress organises guided tours for small groups of students, collectors and institutions, to both the permanent collection and temporary exhibitions, often in the company of the artist.

Audiovisual projects

 How Much Does Your Building Weigh Mr. Foster?, 2010

The documentary, directed by Norberto Lopez Amado and Carlos Carcas, tells the story of one of the world's most renowned architects and his unending quest to improve the quality of life through architecture and design. It describes Norman Foster's upbringing and how his dreams and influences inspired the design of buildings such as Beijing Airport, the Reichstag in Berlin, the Hearst building in New York and the highest bridge in the world, the Millau Viaduct in France, among others.

Written and narrated by Deyan Sudjic, director of the London Design Museum, the film won the nomination for best Spanish film at the Goya Awards of the Spanish Film Academy in 2011, the Audience Award TCM for best European documentary at the International Festival of San Sebastian in 2010 and was selected at the Berlin International Film Festival in the Berlinale Special section, as well as other awards in countries such as France, Belgium and China.

 Bucky Fuller & Spaceship Earth, 2010

The documentary is devised as a homage to the American inventor and it includes fragments of footage and news broadcasts of the time, significant episodes of Fuller’s life and samples of his own thoughts and opinions accompanied by the comments of current leading figures in the arts and sciences (such as Calvin Tomkins, Deyan Sudjic, director of the Design Museum, and the architect Norman Foster) who vindicate the work and reputation of a marginalised genius who was never fully understood nor appreciated.

The film also shows many of his creations, such as his luminous and exquisite ‘lightful houses’, the ecological and aerodynamic Dymaxion—Dynamic Maximum Tension—cars and his magnificent geodesic domes, a perfect combination of art and technology built upon the structural principle of ‘tensegrity’—tensional integrity—a term coined by Fuller himself.

 Conga Irreversible. Los Carpinteros, 2012

Conga Irreversible documents the eponymous performance by the artistic duo Los Carpinteros, which they performed in 2012 during the eleventh Havana Biennial. Also present in the video, alongside over a hundred active participants, are the thousands of people who strolled by the central Paseo del Prado, a space through which the first comparsas marched, beginning what was to become a popular celebration in Cuba.

The work reverses the direction of the choreography and music, while suppressing the emergence of the bright colours characteristic of a traditional comparsa, whose festive and collective nature becomes a tool for cultural communication.

 Polaris. Los Carpinteros, 2014

Polaris, by Los Carpinteros, describes the journey of a musician who hikes up the Pyrenees, drums in tow. Also recorded in a real scenario, it is essentially a sound piece that explores large areas of silence, where the notion of pilgrimage takes on a central role as an abstract and personal ritual.

 TurnOnArt TV, 2013-2015

'TurnOnArt' TV, an online channel by Ivorypress, produces a series of videos documenting fairs, events related to the art world, and interviews with artists, curators and gallery owners.

Its programmes feature interviews with artists such as Not Vital, Olafur Eliasson and John Isaacs, promoters of the publishing world like Louise O'Hare The London Bookshop Map and have also documented fairs such as ParisPhoto, Frieze New York and Pinta London.

References

Publishing companies of Spain